The Andaman treepie (Dendrocitta bayleyii) is a species of bird in the family Corvidae. First described by Robert Christopher Tytler in 1863, it is endemic to the Andaman Islands of India, where its natural habitat is subtropical or tropical moist lowland forests. It is threatened by habitat loss.

The scientific name commemorates the Anglo-Indian statesman Edward Clive Bayley.

References

Andaman treepie
Birds of the Andaman Islands
Andaman treepie
Andaman treepie
Taxonomy articles created by Polbot
Taxobox binomials not recognized by IUCN